MultiWeb Internet Browser was an early freeware Windows web browser for those with disabilities.

The browser was developed by the Equity Access Research and Development Group at Deakin University under a grant from the Australian Commonwealth Department of Health and Family Services. An email client called MultiMail was also developed.

References

External links
 MultiWeb Internet Browser HOME PAGE, Archive.org

Windows web browsers